DJ Company was a German Eurodance and dance-pop trio consisting of Paul Strand, Stefan Benz and Louis Lasky.

Musical career
DJ Company had one chart hit in the United States, "Rhythm of Love", which spent 19 weeks on the Billboard Hot 100, peaking at number 53 in 1997.  Their version of Alphaville's "Forever Young" also received modest airplay that year.  DJ Company's debut album, Rhythm of Love, sold modestly.

Their works have appeared on many compilations since 1994. "Hey Everybody" was featured on Dance Pool Vol. 3 (1994), Mr Music Hits 6/94 (1994), The House of Trance (1994), Larry Präsentiert: Musketier Hits 94 (1994), Dance Now! (1994), and Supersonic Megadance Vol 1 (1995). "Rhythm of Love" was featured on Dance Now! Vol. 8 (1994), Shark Attack Five (1994), Deep Magic Dance 30 (1994), Euro Dance Pool (1995), Dancin Floor (1995), If You Love Dance (1996), All Stars Dance Hits 97 (1997), Utopia (1997), Welcome To The Epidrome (1998), and Dance Now! 9 (1998). "Cybersex-Lovegame" was featured on Dance Now! 11 (1995) and Dancemania 9 (1998).

Discography

Studio albums

Singles

Other singles

As Arena
 1994 - Fly Away

References

German Eurodance groups